The Last Paradise is a 2021 film directed by Rocco Ricciardulli, written by Rocco Ricciardulli and Riccardo Scamarcio and starring Riccardo Scamarcio, Gaia Bermani Amaral and Valentina Cervi.

Production 
The film was shot in the towns of Gravina in Apulia, Bari, and Trieste.

Distribution 
The film was released on the Netflix streaming platform on February 5, 2021. The first trailer was released on Netflix Italia's YouTube channel on January 12, 2021.

Cast 
 Riccardo Scamarcio as Ciccio and Antonio Paradiso
 Gaia Bermani Amaral as Bianca Schettino
 Valentina Cervi as Lucia
 Antonio Gerardi as Cumpà Schettino
 Giovanni Cirfiera as Brigadiere
 Peter Arpesella as Cumpà Schettino (voice)
 Giuseppe Nardone as Bracciante

References

External links
 

2021 films
Italian drama films
2020s Italian-language films
Italian-language Netflix original films
2020s Italian films